Blade of the Ronin is the second studio album by American hip hop duo Cannibal Ox. It was released via IGC Records and iHipHop Distribution on March 3, 2015. It is a follow-up to the duo's 2001 album, The Cold Vein.

Critical reception

At Metacritic, which assigns a weighted average score out of 100 to reviews from mainstream critics, Blade of the Ronin received an average score of 71% based on 16 reviews, indicating "generally favorable reviews".

Spin placed it at number 31 on the "50 Best Hip-Hop Albums of 2015" list.

Track listing

Personnel
Credits adapted from liner notes.

 Vast Aire – vocals, art direction
 Vordul Mega – vocals, art direction
 Bill Cosmiq – production (except 5), vocals (7, 12)
 Double A.B. – vocals (2)
 Kenyattah Black – vocals (4)
 Artifacts – vocals (5)
 U-God – vocals (5)
 Black Milk – production (5)
 Elzhi – vocals (7)
 Elohem Star – vocals (8)
 Space – vocals (8)
 Swave Sevah – vocals (8)
 Irealz – vocals (12)
 MF Doom – vocals (13)
 The Quantum – vocals (18)
 DJ Cip One – turntables
 Brad "Syntax" Theophila – mixing
 Matty Trump – mastering
 Djob Jonathan – artwork
 Salvador – additional art layout

Charts

References

External links
 
 

2015 albums
Cannibal Ox albums
Albums produced by Black Milk